Mahad Assembly constituency is one of the 288 Vidhan Sabha (legislative assembly) constituencies in Maharashtra state in western India. This constituency is located in the Raigad district.

Members of Legislative Assembly

Election results

General elections 2009

General elections 2014

References

Assembly constituencies of Maharashtra
Politics of Raigad district